The Salt of the Earth (also released under the French title Le sel de la terre) is a 2014 internationally co-produced biographical documentary film directed by Wim Wenders and Juliano Ribeiro Salgado. It portrays the works of Salgado's father, the Brazilian photographer Sebastião Salgado.

The film was selected to compete in the Un Certain Regard section at the 2014 Cannes Film Festival where it won the Special Prize. The film was nominated for the Academy Award for Best Documentary Feature at the 87th Academy Awards. It won the 2014 Audience Award at the San Sebastián International Film Festival and the 2015 Audience Award at the Tromsø International Film Festival. It also won the César Award for Best Documentary Film at the 40th César Awards.

Overview
Salgado's photographs and videos featured in the film explored natural environments and the humans who inhabit them. His black and white photographs illuminated how the environment and humans are exploited to maximize profit for the global economic market.  Co-directed by Salgado's son, Juliano Ribeiro Salgado, the film also contains recollections from his childhood of a father who was absent much of the time and the times he accompanied his father on trips to discover who Salgado was beyond his childhood conception.   The film follows 40 years of Salgado's work from South America, to Africa, Europe, the Arctic, and back home to Brazil focusing on international conflicts, starvation and exodus, and natural landscapes in decline.

Synopsis 
Salgado begins a career as an economist with his wife, Lélia, by his side.  During a stint in Paris, Lélia buys a camera, and Salgado discovers his love of photography.

He uses his own photos and videos to illustrate his life and work beginning with his exile from Brazil and his subsequent transition from economist to artist and explorer. Salgado begins working full-time as a photographer in 1973, first news photography then documentary-style, with Lelia supporting him.

Salgado travels around South America, including the countries neighboring his native Brazil, where he spends time among and photographs native tribes like the Zo'é, who lived lives not much touched by the modern world.

Next, Salgado travels to the Sahel region of Africa, shown in unflinching and heartbreaking video and photographs. Salgado refers to the famine in Ethiopia as a problem of distribution, not just a natural disaster. He documents the largest ever refugee camps and the innumerable deaths that occurred there, from hunger, cholera, and cold.  His work covering famine in Africa brings worldwide attention to the region and the underlying causes.

After photographing the Yugoslavian war and Rwanda right after the genocide to one year later, Salgado loses hope for humanity.
Going back to his natal Minas Gerais, he founds Instituto Terra and re-forests his family land.
Then he is inspired to photograph the wildlife.

Reception
The Salt of the Earth received largely positive reviews from critics. According to the review aggregator website Rotten Tomatoes, 95% of critics have given the film a positive review with an average rating of 8.00/10, based on 94 reviews. The site's critics consensus states: "While the work it honors may pose thorny ethical questions that Salt of the Earth neglects to answer, it remains a shattering, thought-provoking testament to Sebastião Salgado's career." At Metacritic, the film has a weighted average score of 83 out of 100 based on 29 critics, indicating "universal acclaim".

References

External links
 
 
 
 

2014 films
2010s biographical films
2014 documentary films
French biographical films
French documentary films
Brazilian biographical films
Brazilian documentary films
Italian biographical films
Italian documentary films
2010s French-language films
2010s Italian-language films
2010s Portuguese-language films
Biographical documentary films
Films directed by Wim Wenders
Films shot in Brazil
Films shot in Indonesia
Films shot in Russia
Films scored by Laurent Petitgand
2010s English-language films
2010s French films
2014 multilingual films
French multilingual films
Brazilian multilingual films
Italian multilingual films